Heliconia pardoi is a species of plant in the family Heliconiaceae, endemic to Ecuador.  Its natural habitat is subtropical or tropical moist montane forest.

References

pardoi
Endemic flora of Ecuador
Vulnerable plants
Taxonomy articles created by Polbot